Otello Toso (22 February 1914 – 15 March 1966) was an Italian film and stage actor.

Born in Padua, Toso graduated from the Centro Sperimentale di Cinematografia in 1939 and immediately later he started his film career. He was particularly prolific in the 1940s, in films in which he usually starred negative characters. After World War II Toso mostly starred in melodramas and genre films, except for Juan Antonio Bardem's Death of a Cyclist. He died at 52 in a car accident in Pieve di Curtarolo, near Padua.

Selected filmography

 1860 (1933) - Piemontese soldier
 The Canal of the Angels (1934)
 Giuseppe Verdi (1938) - Un ammiratore di Verdi al caffè
 Jeanne Doré (1938) - Extra in ball scene
 Ettore Fieramosca (1938) - Un compagno d'arme Gentilino
 Inventiamo l'amore (1938) - Il primo giocatore di biliardo (uncredited)
 Crispino e la comare (1938)
 Io, suo padre (1939)
 Le père Lebonnard (1939) - Gaetano (uncredited)
 Ultima giovinezza (1939)
 Follie del secolo (1939) - Jean Kennedy, il violonista
 The Last Enemy (1940) - Enzo
 Il ponte dei sospiri (1940) - Rolando Candiano
 La granduchessa si diverte (1940) - Maurizio
 Ridi pagliaccio (1941) - Giorgio Veri
 Brivido (1941)
 Pirates of Malaya (1941) - Il tenente Schmidt
 Tentazione (1941) - Lorenzo Wendich, l'ingegnere
 Le signorine della villa accanto (1942) - Suo nipote
 Soltanto un bacio (1942) - Gianni Astolfi
 The Two Orphans (1942) - Giacomo
 Yellow Hell (1942) - Giorgio
 The Woman of Sin (1942) - Suo marito
 Special Correspondents (1943) - Renato Marini
 Vietato ai minorenni (1944) - Barra
 Mist on the Sea (1944) - Il dottore Leonardo Monti
 The Ten Commandments (1945) - (segment "Non rubare")
 Two Anonymous Letters (1945) - Tullio
 Fuga nella tempesta (1945) - Assassino
 La sua strada (1946) - Il giovanetto
 For the Love of Mariastella (1946) - Turi della Tonnara, detto 'Malacarne'
 Vanity (1947)
 Il corriere di ferro (1947) - L'aviatore italo-americano
 Il principe ribelle (1947)
 I cavalieri dalle maschere nere (1948) - Blasco di Castiglione
 Faddija – La legge della vendetta (1950) - Michele
 Captain Demonio (1950)
 Santo disonore (1950) - Alfredo
 Cavalcade of Heroes (1950) - Angelo Masina
 Alina (1950) - Marco
 Verginità (1951) - Giancarlo
 Revenge of a Crazy Girl (1951) - Carlo
 Black Fire (1951) - Stefano
 The Cliff of Sin (1951)
 What Price Innocence? (1952) - Stefano Rella
 La voce del sangue (1952) - Carlo Mattei
 Rimorso (1952)
 La colpa di una madre (1952) - Mr. Herbert
 Er fattaccio (1952) - Bruno
 Carcerato (1953) - Marco
 Una donna prega (1953) - Giulio Aureli
 Desiderio 'e sole (1954) - Count Sergio Sirovich
 Letter from Naples (1954) - Álvaro Ramírez
 Tears of Love (1954) - Davide Montalto
 Piscatore 'e Pusilleco (1954) - Walter
 Bertoldo, Bertoldino e Cacasenno (1954) - Lord Wilmore
 La trovatella di Milano (1955) - Miguel Castro
 The Knight of the Black Sword (1956) - Marchese Altamura
 Tormento d'amore (1956) - Luigi
 Amaramente (1956) - Andrea
 La trovatella di Milano (1956) - Count Giorgio Patti
 Onore e sangue (1957) - Arturo Ferretti
 Il Conte di Matera (1958) - Count Rambaldo Tramontana di Casamaiora
 Desert Desperadoes (1959) - Verrus
 Il peccato degli anni verdi (1960) - Elena Giordani's Father
 Pulcinella, cetrulo di Acerra (1961)
 Planets Against Us (I pianeti contro di noi) (1962) - Maj. Michelotti

References

External links 
 

Italian male film actors
1914 births
Actors from Padua
Italian male television actors
Italian male stage actors
1966 deaths
Centro Sperimentale di Cinematografia alumni
Road incident deaths in Italy
20th-century Italian male actors